Jennifer Glover Konfrst (born December 24, 1973) is an American politician in the state of Iowa. A Democrat, she has been a member of the Iowa House of Representatives representing the 32nd district since 2019. She is the House minority leader, a position that she has held since 2021.

Early life 
Konfrst was born on December 24, 1973, in Macomb, Illinois. She grew up in Des Moines, Iowa, Fort Dodge, Iowa, and Webster, Florida. She graduated with a bachelors of arts degree in journalism and mass communications and a masters of public administration from Drake University. She worked for Iowa PBS for twelve years. She is an associate professor of journalism and strategic political communication at Drake University. She and her husband, Lee, have two children.

Political career 
She first ran to represent the 43rd district in the Iowa House of Representatives in 2016, but lost to Republican incumbent Chris Hagenow. In 2018, Hagenow moved to the 19th district. Konfrst ran again for the newly-open seat and won. She won re-election in 2020. Konfrst sits on the administration and rules committee, the judiciary committee, the local government committee, the state government committee and the transportation committee. She was the assistant minority leader in 2019 and 2020 and the minority whip in 2021. When Todd Prichard stepped down as the House minority leader in 2021, Konfrst was elected on June 14, 2021 as the new House minority leader. She is the first woman to hold this position in Iowa.

In 2022 she ran for re-election and won in the 32nd district against Republican Mark Brown.

Electoral record

References

External links 

 

1973 births
21st-century American politicians
21st-century American women politicians
Drake University alumni
Living people
Democratic Party members of the Iowa House of Representatives
Women state legislators in Iowa